Christer Eric Sandelin (born 5 November 1961) is a Swedish singer, songwriter and musician. He has been a part of two groups. In 1978, he was in the Swedish group Freestyle with Tommy Ekman, Joakim Hagleitner, Gigi Hamilton, Diane Söderholm and Anders Uddbergand, and after the break-up of the band in 1983, he continued with Ekman and Hamilton to form the Swedish band trio Style.

In 1989, he started his solo career with his debut album Luften darrar and has had a number of albums. He has also produced for a number of artists Lars Vegas trio and the duos Ronny och Ragge, Rob'n'Raz, Antique and The Graaf Sisters (Magdalena Graaf and Hannah Graaf) and singer Vicki Benckert.

He also continued to cooperate extensively with Tommy Ekman including writing and producing together and in their joint album I Stero and the joint single "Singlar (oh oh)".

In popular culture
Christer Eric Sandelin has taken part a number of times in Melodifestivalen. In Melodifestivalen 1986 he sang "Dover-Calais" as part of band Style placing 3rd. He also repeated in Melodifestivalen 1987 with "Hand i hand" again with Style, placing 6th. 
The song "Dover-Calais" written by Sandelin and Tommy Ekart and performed by Style was used in soundtrack of 1989 film S/Y Joy (Swedish S/Y Glädjen). 
He has appeared on a number of television shows including Så mycket bättre in 2010, the program's first season. In 2011–2012, he took part in the series Copycat Singers appearing in episode 7, broadcast on January 19th 2012.

Discography
(For discography while in Freestyle and Style, see their respective pages)

Albums
1989: Luften darrar1990: Drömmer i färg1992: Till månen runt solen1994: Activity!1997: Jag lever nuJoint album
2004: I stereo (Sandelin and Ekman) 
Soundtrack
1995: Mördande intelligensSingles
1986: "Mine"
1989: "Hit Me!"
1989: "Luften darrar"
1989: "Det hon vill ha"
1990: "Vi är"
1990: "Jag tror hon inte vet"
1990: "Kom in i mitt liv"
1991: "Ge och ta (Jag vill tala om för hela världen)"
1992: "Galen"
1992: "Till månen runt solen"
1992: "Murar kan falla"
1993: "Secrets"
1994: "Kitsch Will Make You Happy"
1994: "My Girl (Remix)"
1995: "Fresh"
1997" "Jag lever nu"
1997: "Kan inte sova"
1997: "Sol Sol Sol"

Joint Sandelin/Ekman
1990: "10"
2004: "Så länge du vill"
2004: "Upp för trappan"
2005: "Komma dig nära"
2005: "Dansar med mig själv"
2006: "Singlar (oh, oh)"

Soundtracks
1998: "Pojkar som män" (from film Lilla Jönssonligan på styva linan'')

References

External links
Discogs

Swedish male singers
Swedish record producers
1961 births
Living people
Singers from Stockholm
English-language singers from Sweden
Freestyle (Swedish band)
Melodifestivalen contestants of 2003
Melodifestivalen contestants of 1987
Melodifestivalen contestants of 1986